Panos Costa Panay is an American business executive.  He is the chief product officer of Microsoft, where he oversees the company's Windows and Devices division. He oversees the development of Surface products and related hardware, along with the Windows client operating system.

Panay introduced Windows 11 on the Windows Experience Blog on June 24, 2021.

Personal life

Panay received an M.B.A. from Pepperdine University and a B.Sc. from California State University, Northridge.

He is of Greek-Cypriot descent. His first cousin, Panos (Andreas) Panay, is a music entrepreneur.

Career

Panay was responsible for electromechanical devices at NMB Technologies (a subsidiary of MinebeaMitsumi) in Michigan from 2000 to 2004.

Microsoft 
Panay joined Microsoft in 2004. Panay is sometimes considered the "father" of the Surface brand. In late August 2021, he was promoted to become an executive vice president and joined the senior leadership team that advises CEO Satya Nadella.

Notes

Microsoft employees
Year of birth missing (living people)
Living people